Ski jumping at the 1976 Winter Olympics consisted of two events held from 7 to 15 February, with the large hill event taking place at Bergiselschanze, and the normal hill event at Seefeld.

Medal summary

Medal table

Austria and East Germany split the six medals evenly.

Events

Participating NOCs

Fifteen nations participated in ski jumping at the Innsbruck Games.

References

 
1976 Winter Olympics events
1976
1976 in ski jumping